Abid Kovačević (born 1 July 1952) is a Bosnian-Herzegovinian retired footballer. He was capped twice by Yugoslavia.

Club career
Kovačević played for Ethnikos Piraeus F.C. in the Greek Super League from 1981–1984.

International career
He made his debut for Yugoslavia in a January 1977 friendly match away against Colombia and has earned a total of 2 caps, scoring no goals. His second and final international was a friendly 9 days later against Mexico.

References

External links

Profile at Serbian federation official site

1952 births
Living people
People from Mrkonjić Grad
Association football forwards
Yugoslav footballers
Yugoslavia international footballers
FK Borac Banja Luka players
GNK Dinamo Zagreb players
Ethnikos Piraeus F.C. players
Yugoslav First League players
Yugoslav Second League players
Super League Greece players
Yugoslav expatriate footballers
Expatriate footballers in Greece
Yugoslav expatriate sportspeople in Greece